Oak Grove is a census-designated place (CDP) in Lexington County, South Carolina, United States. The population was 10,291 at the 2010 census. It is part of the Columbia Metropolitan Statistical Area.

Geography
It is bordered to the east by West Columbia and to the southeast by Springdale. U.S. Route 1 (Augusta Road) is the main road through Oak Grove; it leads east (northbound) into Columbia and west (southbound)  to Lexington, the county seat.

Demographics

2020 census

As of the 2020 United States census, there were 12,899 people, 4,446 households, and 2,640 families residing in the CDP.

2000 census
As of the census of 2000, there were 8,183 people, 3,368 households, and 2,320 families residing in the CDP. The population density was 1,214.2 people per square mile (468.8/km2). There were 3,626 housing units at an average density of 538.0/sq mi (207.7/km2). The racial makeup of the CDP was 88.45% White, 8.19% African American, 0.34% Native American, 1.03% Asian, 0.01% Pacific Islander, 0.82% from other races, and 1.16% from two or more races. Hispanic or Latino of any race were 2.25% of the population.

There were 3,368 households, out of which 32.3% had children under the age of 18 living with them, 52.9% were married couples living together, 12.7% had a female householder with no husband present, and 31.1% were non-families. 25.0% of all households were made up of individuals, and 7.9% had someone living alone who was 65 years of age or older. The average household size was 2.43 and the average family size was 2.90.

In the CDP, the population was spread out, with 24.2% under the age of 18, 7.2% from 18 to 24, 35.2% from 25 to 44, 23.6% from 45 to 64, and 9.8% who were 65 years of age or older. The median age was 36 years. For every 100 females, there were 93.7 males. For every 100 females age 18 and over, there were 91.9 males.

The median income for a household in the CDP was $42,338, and the median income for a family was $48,904. Males had a median income of $31,511 versus $25,845 for females. The per capita income for the CDP was $19,509. About 2.6% of families and 4.8% of the population were below the poverty line, including 5.3% of those under age 18 and 7.5% of those age 65 or over.

References

Census-designated places in Lexington County, South Carolina
Census-designated places in South Carolina
Columbia metropolitan area (South Carolina)